"I Will Rock and Roll with You" is a song written and originally recorded by Johnny Cash for his 1978 album Gone Girl.

Released in December 1978 as the album's third and final single (Columbia 3-10888, with "A Song for the Life" on the opposite side), the song reached number 21 on U.S. Billboard country chart in March.

Track listing

Charts

References

External links 
 "I Will Rock and Roll with You" on the Johnny Cash official website

Songs about rock music
Johnny Cash songs
1978 songs
1978 singles
Columbia Records singles
Songs written by Johnny Cash
American country music songs
American rock-and-roll songs